La Marseillaise des Blancs is a royalist and Catholic adaptation of the national anthem of France. The lyrical content of the Royal and Catholic variation is strongly counter-revolutionary and originated from the War in the Vendée, where locals attempted to resist the republican forces in 1793. The name "Blancs" refers to their use of white flags and symbols.

Lyrics
The lyrics below are based on a translation by Charles A. Coulombe. In the first verse, the term "blues" refers to the revolutionary republicans—the Jacobins. The Rodrigue mentioned in the second verse refers to François-Ambroise Rodrigue, a local bishop who collaborated with the Revolution, contrary to papal authority. Similarly, the "treasonous priests" in the fourth verse refers to certain "Constitutional priests", who swore loyalty to the government of the republican regime over the Pope; priests who refused such an oath had their parishes taken away from them and were replaced. In the same verse the Camus mentioned is Armand-Gaston Camus, the Secretary of the Revolutionary Convention, who played a major role in seizing Church property and the regicide of the King of France.

See also
 La Vandeana
 Oriamendi

References

External links

Royalist Marseillaise 1793

French anthems
French counter-revolutionaries
La Marseillaise